West Muncie is an unincorporated community in Mount Pleasant Township, Delaware County, Indiana.

History
A post office was established in West Muncie in 1893, and remained in operation until it was discontinued in 1902. It lies west of Muncie, hence the name.

Geography

References

Unincorporated communities in Delaware County, Indiana
Unincorporated communities in Indiana